Carolina Elite Cobras, formerly Central SC Cobras, is an American women's soccer team, founded in 2010. The team is a member of the United Soccer Leagues W-League, the second tier of women's soccer in the United States and Canada.

History
The team played its first season at Younts Soccer Stadium on the campus of Columbia College in Columbia, SC. But, moved to Greenville, SC for the 2013 season. For the 2013 season the Central SC Cobras FC acquired new Sponsoring Partner Carolina Elite Soccer Academy (CESA). Though the franchise is still based out of Columbia it now also works out of  Greenville. The addition of Elite to the name was made as part of the sponsoring agreement so Central  SC Cobras -Carolina Cobras - Carolina Elite Cobras was the evolution as things began to change after the 2012 season. The team will play the majority of  their home games at MESA Soccer Complex in Greenville. The team moved to the soccer field at the Kroc Community Center in Greenville for the 2015 season.

2012 season

In their inaugural season the Central SC Cobras played at Younts Soccer Stadium on the campus of Columbia College in Columbia, SC. The Team finished third in the Southeastern Division of the then Eastern Conference, was voted the USL W-League Rookie Franchise of the year, and Saw Defender Tabitha Padget recognized by making the All Conference Team.

2013 season

The Caroline Elite Cobras finished the 2013 season in fourth place in the USL W-League after winning the Southeastern Conference Championship. Cobras defender Blakely Mattern was awarded the USL W-League Defender of the Year Award as well as being named to the USL W-League All-League and All-Conference teams. Goalkeeper Elizabeth "Rose" Hull was nominated for USL W-League Goalkeeper of the Year and was selected to the USL W-League All-Conference team along with defender Ashley Swinehart.

2014 season
The Cobras finished third in the Southeastern Conference. They missed qualifying for the conference playoff by one standings point. Blakely Mattern again was named to the All-League and All-Conference teams. Defender Kailey Mattison was named to the All-Southeastern Conference team.

Year-by-year

Players
The following former players have played at the senior international and/or professional level:
 Sylvia Gee

External links

USL W-League
Carolina Elite Cobras

References

2010 establishments in South Carolina
Association football clubs established in 2010
Soccer teams in South Carolina
Sports in Columbia, South Carolina
USL W-League (1995–2015) teams
Sports in Greenville, South Carolina
Women's sports in South Carolina